Elections to the Senate of the Philippines are done via plurality-at-large voting; a voter can vote for up to twelve candidates, with the twelve candidates with the highest number of votes being elected. The 24-member Senate uses staggered elections, with only one-half of its members up for election at any given time, except for special elections, which are always held concurrently with regularly scheduled elections.

Manner of choosing candidates
With the advent of the nominal multi-party system In 1987, political parties have not been able to muster enough candidates to fill their 12-person slate. This means they have to join coalitions or alliances in order to present a full slate. If a slate is still not complete, "guest candidates" may be invited, even from rival slates. A guest candidate may not be compelled to join the campaign rallies of the slate that invited him/her. A party may even not include their entire ticket to a coalition slate, or assign their candidates to competing slates. A candidate may defect from one slate to another or be unaffiliated with any slate while the campaign is ongoing. The Commission on Elections uses the names of the political parties on the ballot.

Once elected, the parties involved in the different slates may form alliances with one another totally different from the alliances prior to the election.

In Third Republic elections under the nominal two-party system, the Liberal Party and the Nacionalista Party often presented complete 8-person tickets; a party may even exceed the 8-person slate due to perceived popularity. The first instance of having guest candidates was in 1955, when the opposition Liberals adopted Claro M. Recto of the Nacionalista Party, who had also opposed the presidency of Ramon Magsaysay. Parties having guest candidates was seen as a weakness of finding candidates within their ranks.

Manner of election

1916 to 1935

From 1916 to 1934, the country was divided into 12 senatorial districts. Eleven of these districts elected two senators each. In 1916, each district elected two senators (plurality-at-large): one was to serve a six-year term, the other a three-year term. On each election thereafter, one seat per district was up (first past the post). The senators from the 12th district were appointed by the American governor-general for no fixed term.

In 1935, the electorate approved in a plebiscite a new constitution that abolished the Senate and instituted a unicameral National Assembly of the Philippines. The members of the Constitutional Convention originally wanted bicameralism but could not agree on how the senators shall be elected: via the senatorial districts or being nationally elected.

1941 to 1949
The electorate In 1940 approved in a plebiscite amendments to the constitution that restored the bicameral Congress of the Philippines, including the Senate. Elections for the Senate were held on every second Monday of November of every odd-numbered year; however, the old senatorial districts were not used anymore; instead, the 24-member Senate was to be elected on a nationwide at-large basis. As the first election in the new setup, the voters in the 1941 election voted for 24 senators. However, they were also given the option of writing the party's name on the ballot, wherein all of the candidates of the party would receive votes. With the 24 candidates with the most votes winning in the election, the ruling Nacionalista Party won all 24 seats in a landslide victory. The winners included Rafael Martinez, who replaced Norberto Romualdez, who died the day before the election; Martinez won because of voters who had selected the party, rather than specifying a particular candidate.

Due to World War II, Congress was not able to convene until June 1945. President Sergio Osmeña called for special sessions to convene the 1st Congress of the Commonwealth of the Philippines until elections could be organized. Originally, to observe the staggered terms, the eight candidates with the most votes were to serve for eight years, the next eight for four years, and still the next eight for two years. However, several members had died and others were disqualified because they were charged with collaboration with the Japanese, so the Senate conducted a lottery to determine which senators would serve until 1946 and which would serve until 1947. In the 1946 election, voters elected 16 senators; the first eight candidates with the highest number of votes were to serve until 1951, the next eight were to serve until 1949.

1951 to 1971

Electoral reform enacted in 1951 eliminated block voting, which had given voters the option of writing the party's name on the ballot. In a 1951 election, voters voted for eight senators for the first time and each voter had to write at most eight names for senator (writing the party's name would result in a spoiled vote). Noting that after the elimination of block voting, many people voted for a split ticket, political scientist David Wurfel has remarked that "The electoral reform of 1951 was thus one of the most important institutional changes in the postwar Philippines, making the life of the opposition easier."

On September 23, 1972, President Ferdinand Marcos declared martial law and assumed legislative powers. In a 1973 plebiscite, the electorate approved a new constitution that abolished Congress and replaced it with a unicameral National Assembly, which would ultimately be the Batasang Pambansa (parliament).

1987 to present

Marcos was overthrown as a result of the 1986 People Power Revolution. The new president, Corazon Aquino, appointed a Constitutional Commission to write a new constitution. The electorate approved the constitution in 1987, restoring the bicameral Congress. Instead of electing 8 senators every two years, the new constitution provided that 12 senators would be elected every three years. As part of the transitory provisions, the voters elected 24 senators in the 1987 election, to serve until 1992. In the 1992 election, the voters still voted for 24 candidates, but the first 12 candidates with the most votes were to serve until 1998, while the next 12 were to serve only until 1995. Thereafter, 12 candidates are elected every second Monday of May every third year since 1995.

Summary

List of results

Senatorial districts era

At-large era
In this table, the "administration" ticket is the ticket supported by the sitting president. In 1992, Corazon Aquino who was nominally supporting the LDP, supported the presidential candidacy of Fidel V. Ramos of Lakas, making the "administration ticket" ambiguous.

Top-notcher 
Since the at-large era, a high-scoring winner can be seen as a strong contender for a future presidential or vice-presidential bid.

Senate composition 
These are at the start of each Congress. A senator may change parties or leave office mid-term.

Latest elections

2022

2019

2016

2013

2010

2007

References